Tarjumān al-Ashwāq ('the interpreter/translator/guide/biographer of longings/desires') is a collection of 61 self-standing nasībs by the Andalusian Sufi mystic Muḥyī al-Dīn Ibn al-ʿArabī (1165–1240).

Editions and translations

Arabic

 Ibn al-ʿArabī, Dhakhāʾir al-Aʿlāq: Sharḥ. Turjumān al-Ashwāq, ed. Muḥ ammad Abd al-Raḥ mān al-Kurdī (Cairo, 1968) [includes both poems and Ibn al-ʿArabī's commentary].
 Ibn al-ʿArabī, Turjumān al-Ashwāq (Beirut: Dār Ṣādir, 1966) [includes both poems and Ibn al-ʿArabī's commentary].

English

 Reynold Nicholson, The Tarjumán al-Ashwáq: A Collection of Mystical Odes by Muhyiddīn Ibn al-ʿArabī (1911, London: Royal Asiatic Society, Oriental Translation Series, New Series xx; reprinted in 1981 by the Theosophical Publishing House, Wheaton, Illinois).
 Sells, Michael, 'Return to the Flash Rock Plain of Thahmad: Two Nasībs by Ibn al-ʿArabī', Journal of Arabic Literature, 39 (2008), 3–13 (p. 4); DOI: 10.1163/157006408X310825 [translates poems 22 and 26].
 Sells, M., ‘ “You’d Have Seen What Melts the Mind”: Ibn al-ʿArabī's Poem #20 from the Turjumān al-Ashwāq’, in Jonathan P. Decter and Michael Rand, eds., Studies in Arabic and Hebrew Letters in Honor of Raymond P. Scheindlin (Gorgias Press, 2007).
 Sells, Michael, Stations of Desire: Love Elegies from Ibn al-ʿArabī and New Poems (Jerusalem: Ibis Editions, 2001) [translates 24 of the poems into English].
 Sells, Michael, 'Ibn 'Arabi's "Gentle Now, Doves of the Thornberry and Moringa Thicket" (ālā yā hamāmāti l-arākati wa l-bāni)',  The Journal of the Muhyiddin Ibn 'Arabi Society, 10 (1991), http://www.ibnarabisociety.org/articles/poemtarjuman11.html [translates poem 11].

Romance

 Maurice Gloton (trans.), L’Interprète des Désires, Turjumān al-Ashwāq, Traduit de l’arabe (Paris: Albin Michel, 1997) [complete French translation of both the poems and their author's commentary upon them].
 Vincente Cantorino (trans)., Casidas de amor profano y místico: Ibn Zaydun e Ibn ʿArabi (Mexico City: Porrua, 1988) [Spanish translation].
 Ibn Arabi, El Intérprete de los Deseos (Tarŷumān al-Ašwāq), trans. by Carlos Varona Narvión (Murcia: Editora Regional de Murcia, Colección Ibn Arabi, 2002) [Spanish translation].

References

External links 

 Ibn Arabi's poem 53 from Tarjuman Al Ashwaq (The Interpreter of Desires), translated by Yasmine Seale and Robin Moger

Arabic and Central Asian poetics
Sufi literature
Islamic poetry
Love in Arabic literature
Medieval Arabic poems
Ibn Arabi